Ray Shah (born 31 January 1978) came to prominence in public life as a contestant on the Channel 4 reality programme Big Brother, in which he finished second.

Since his exit from the Big Brother house, Shah entered a career in the entertainment industry in Ireland. He has been presenter on Dublin's Q102 radio station. He also presented his own television show On The Box on Dublin's City Channel. Guests on this show have included Dave Couse and former Eurovision contestant Mickey Joe Harte.

Shah has also been a presenter on 4fm, but now presents a show on iRadio.

Shah participated in RTÉ's a New Year's Eve special edition of Celebrity Jigs 'n' Reels.

Ray set up his own business in 2012 called Bodyfirst Nutrition which sells sports nutrition supplements. There are now two stores in Dublin

References

1978 births
Living people
Big Brother (British TV series) contestants
Irish broadcasters
People from Artane, Dublin